The 2003 Sultan of Selangor Cup was played on 29 March 2003, at Shah Alam Stadium in Shah Alam, Selangor.

Match 
Source:

Veterans 
A match between veterans of two teams are also held in the same day before the real match starts as a curtain raiser.

References 

2003 in Malaysian football
Selangor FA
Sultan of Selangor Cup